Stonebone is an album by jazz trombonists Kai Winding and J. J. Johnson featuring performances recorded in 1969 and released by CTI only in Japan.

Reception
The Allmusic review by Richard S. Ginell awarded the album 4½ stars and stated "It is a prototype of the CTI formula of the '70s, allowing first-class jazz musicians to groove at length with minimal shaping on the production end to give these tracks drama".

Track listing
 "Dontcha Hear Me Callin' to Ya?" (Rudy Stevenson)
 "Musings" (Johnson)
 "Mojo" (Johnson)
 "Recollections" (Joe Zawinul)

Personnel
 J. J. Johnson – trombone
 Kai Winding – trombone
 Herbie Hancock – keyboards
 Bob James – keyboards
 Ross Tompkins – keyboards
 George Benson – guitar
 Ron Carter – double bass
 Grady Tate – drums

References

CTI Records albums
J. J. Johnson albums
Kai Winding albums
1970 albums
Albums produced by Creed Taylor
Albums recorded at Van Gelder Studio